Saving Abel is an American rock band from Corinth, Mississippi, founded in 2004 by Jared Weeks and Jason Null. The band is named after the biblical story of Cain and Abel, in which a man named Cain kills his brother Abel. Band member Jason Null thought up the band title saying "I Googled the story of Cain and Abel and found a line about 'there was no saving Abel,' which just jumped out at me."

Lead singer Jared Weeks left the band at the end of 2013 to pursue a solo career, but returned in 2021, replacing Scott Austin.

History 

Lead singer Jared Weeks and lead guitarist Jason Null began forming Saving Abel in the small town of Corinth, Mississippi in 2004. Weeks was learning to play the guitar at his best friend's house and Null, who was in a competing rock band in the same town, walked in to rehearse, hit it off, and several days later were writing songs together. Early in 2005, their songs caught the ear of noted producer Skidd Mills, who brought the two into his 747 Studio in Memphis, Tennessee to record some of the songs.

The band gradually came together with the addition of rhythm guitarist Scott Bartlett, bassist Daniel Dwight, and drummer Blake Dixon. Weeks would throw demo CDs onto the stages of bigger bands that toured through Corinth. After shopping the album around for almost a year, and a member change as original bassist Daniel Dwight left the group, they picked up bassist and long time friend Eric Taylor.

"Addicted" was heard by former Virgin A&R consultant Scott Frazier, President of Overtone Music Group. Scott e-mailed the song to CEO of Virgin Music Company Jason Flom who liked what he heard and sent Kim Stephens to watch the band perform in Jackson, Tennessee. "Addicted" was released in March 2008 as a single followed by their major label debut, Saving Abel, on March 11, 2008. "Addicted", which rose to No. 2 on the Billboard Mainstream Rock Songs chart. On January 15, 2009, the album peaked at No. 49 on the Billboard 200. The album received the certification of Gold in the week of March 16, 2009, because of the lead single.

In mid-2009, the band embarked on a tour with Canadian rock band Nickelback during their Dark Horse Tour, along with Hinder and Papa Roach, bringing the band through Live Nation outdoor amphitheaters. In April 2009, the band struck down allegations that there was a rivalry with fellow tour-mates Hinder.

Virgin released the Saving Abel EP, 18 Days Tour, on April 7, 2009, that contained an acoustic version of the song "18 Days" along with two new songs. In the latter part of 2009, Saving Abel headlined a U.S. tour with the bands Red, Pop Evil and Taddy Porter in supporting slots.

The band worked on their second studio album Miss America throughout late 2009 and early 2010. During the making of the record, the song "The Sex Is Good" was somehow leaked onto YouTube. The new album, which offered a download-able only acoustic version of the song "The Sex Is Good", was released via Virgin Records on June 8, 2010. The first single from the CD, "Stupid Girl (Only In Hollywood)", was released earlier that year on April 8 and hit radio on April 26. The song went to No. 7 on the Mainstream Rock Song chart. "The Sex Is Good" was later issued as the second single, reaching the No. 1 spot on the same chart in January 2011. The third single was "Miss America".

In 2011, they embarked on a tour where they played at the Guantanamo Bay detention camp, as well as many barbecues, chili cook-offs, motorcycle rallies and state fairs. They also played for the American military in Kuwait.

On May 14, 2012, the band debuted "Bringing Down the Giant". Their third album, Bringing Down the Giant, was released on July 17, 2012. They went on a tour to promote their new album.

On April 20, 2013, Saving Abel performed in Waterloo, Iowa to raise funds for a community healing project to raise funds for the creation of Angel's Park in Evansdale, Iowa. The park was inspired by Elizabeth Collins and Lyric Cook. The girls vanished in July 2012, and were found deceased in December. No arrests have been made. The park is to serve as sanctuary to residents of the Cedar Valley, to remember their own Angels.

On May 21, 2013, Saving Abel released information on their website regarding Cracking the Safe, which was set to be released on August 6, 2013. On December 26, 2013, Weeks posted on the band's Facebook that he would be leaving the band to pursue a solo career. Scott Austin, frontman for Trash The Brand, was announced as Weeks' permanent replacement as lead singer. The same day drummer Michael McManus announced his departure from the band via Twitter. No reason was given, and the band did not comment on his departure.

On November 11, 2014, they released their latest album, Blood Stained Revolution. The final single off the album, "15 Minutes of Fame", was released on February 22, 2015.

On May 17, 2016, the band announced that they would be taking part in the Make America Rock Again super tour throughout 2016. The tour featured other bands who had success throughout the 2000s including Trapt, Saliva, Alien Ant Farm, Crazy Town, 12 Stones, Tantric, Drowning Pool, Puddle of Mudd, P.O.D. and Fuel.

On June 14, 2017, the band announced that Scott Wilson would be joining and replacing Eric Taylor and Blake Dixon would be replacing Steven Pulley on drums. Also working with  David Adkins at Integrity Music Management 

On July 4, 2021, Saving Abel announced via a post to its Facebook page that Scott Austin has, like Jared Weeks, left the band to pursue a solo career. The post was signed "Jason, Scotty, Bartlett, Wilson, Steven."

On July 7, 2021, Saving Abel announced the return of Jared Weeks.

During an interview with BlabberMouth, it was announced that Dave Moraata, the drummer of Jared Week's solo project, would be replacing Steven Pulley.

Band members
Current members
 Jason Null – lead guitar, backing vocals (2004–present)
 Scott Bartlett – rhythm guitar, backing vocals (2004–present)
 Jared Weeks – lead vocals (2004–2013, 2021–present)
 Dave Moraata  – drums (2021–present)
 Scott Wilson – bass (2017–present)

Former members
 Blake Dixon – drums (2004–2011, 2017–2018)
 Daniel Dwight – bass (2004–2007)
 Eric Taylor – bass, backing vocals (2007–2017) 
 Michael McManus – drums (2011–2013)
 Scott Austin – lead vocals (2014–2021)
Steven Pulley – drums (2013–2017, 2018–2021)

Timeline

Discography

 Saving Abel (2008)
 Miss America (2010)
 Bringing Down the Giant (2012)
 Blood Stained Revolution (2014)

References

External links

 

Musical groups established in 2004
American post-grunge musical groups
Rock music groups from Mississippi
American southern rock musical groups
People from Corinth, Mississippi